Crawley is a surname. Notable people with the surname include:

Aidan Crawley (1908–1993), British politician, journalist, and writer, related to the Crawley-Boevey baronets
Annie Crawley (born 1968), American underwater photographer
Ben Crawley (born 1971), American soccer player
Bill Crawley, American history professor
Charles Crawley (1908–1935), English cricketer
Christine Crawley, Baroness Crawley (born 1950), British politician
Cosmo Crawley (1904–1989), English cricketer
David Crawley (bishop) (born 1937), Canadian archbishop
David Crawley (Gaelic footballer) (born 1977), Irish footballer
Desmond Crawley (1917–1993), British diplomat
Edward F. Crawley, American professor
F. R. Crawley (1911–1987), Canadian film producer
Geoffrey Crawley (1926–2010), British photographic expert and journalist
George A. Crawley (1864–1926), British artist and designer
George Baden Crawley (1833–1879), British railway constructor
Ian Crawley (1962–2008), English footballer
Jacqueline Crawley, American neuroscientist
Jim Crawley (born 1934), American football coach
John Crawley (born 1971), English cricketer
John Crawley (judge) (1940–2013), American jurist
John Crawley (soccer) (born 1972), Australian football coach
Judith Crawley (1914–1986), Canadian film producer
Leonard Crawley (1903–1981), English sportsman and journalist
Marita Crawley (born 1954), British songwriter and playwright, widowed daughter-in-law of Aidan Crawley
Mark Crawley (born 1967), English cricketer
Mick Crawley, British ecologist
Mike Crawley, Canadian alternative energy CEO and former president of the Liberal Party of Canada
Peter Crawley (boxer) (1799–1865), British bare-knuckle boxer
Peter Crawley (headmaster) (born 1953), Australian headmaster
Peter Crawley (cricketer), British cricketer
Richard Crawley (1840–1893), Welsh writer, academic and insurance executive
Samuel Crawley (1790–1852), English politician
Stephen Crawley (born 1962), Scottish cricketer
Sylvia Crawley (born 1972), American basketball player
Tyrone Crawley (born 1958), American professional boxer
William Crawley, Northern Irish journalist
Zak Crawley (born 1998), English cricketer

Fictional characters 
 Crawley family in Vanity Fair, a novel (1847–1848) by William Makepeace Thackeray
 Con Crawley, character in the novel Florence Macarthy (1818) by Sydney, Lady Morgan
 Frank Crawley, a character in the classic novel Rebecca and its 1940 movie adaption, and 1979 and 1997 TV adaptions
 Bertrand Crawley, a Marvel Comics character associated with Moon Knight
 Crawley (Marvel Cinematic Universe), the Marvel Cinematic Universe adaptation 
 Crawley family, an aristocratic family whose lives are the subject of the television series Downton Abbey

See also
Crowley (surname)

Surnames of English origin